Seaforth is a coastal town and locality in the Mackay Region, Queensland, Australia. In the  the locality of Seaforth had a population of 789 people.

Geography 

Finlaysons Point is a headland at the northernmost of the locality. The coastline near the point and extending along the north-east coastline is a sandy beach. The town is beside the beach with most of the residential development in the town or along that stretch of coast.

Apart from this, the predominant land use is grazing on native vegetation.

Seaforth has the following mountains:

 Mount Springcliffe 
 Mount Sweetland 

and the following mountain passes:

 Macartneys Gap
 Niddoes Gap
Islands off-shore from Seaforth include:

 Redcliff Islands
 Acacia Island (also known as Chings Island).

History 
In 1899 the Queensland Government bought Seaforth Estate from H.M. Finlayson, a pioneer selector, as a settlement and named it Springcliff; however local residents always called it Seaforth and it was officially renamed Seaforth in 1966. Finlayson Point is named after Finlayson.

Seaforth Provisional School opened on 22 August 1887 and closed in late 1891. A second Seaforth Provisional School opened on 23 April 1935. On 25 October 1948 it became Seaforth State School. The old provisional school building was relocated to become the Seaforth Presbyterian Church, which opened in May 1949 and which served the congregation until May 1961 when the present church was opened. It later became known as the Seaforth Uniting Church after Methodist Church entered into the amalgamation to create the Uniting Church in Australia.

In the  the locality of Seaforth had a population of 789 people.

There is a former church building at 53 Palm Avenue.

Education 
Seaforth State School is a government primary (Prep-6) school for boys and girls at 2092 Seaforth Road. In 2018, the school had an enrolment of 80 students with 8 teachers (6 full-time equivalent) and 9 non-teaching staff (4 full-time equivalent). It includes a special education program.

There is no secondary school in Seaforth. The nearest government secondary schools are Calen District State College in Calen to the west and Mackay North State High School in North Mackay to the south-east.

Amenities 
The Mackay Regional Council operates a mobile library service on a fortnightly schedule near the school and at Seaforth Reserve Road.

The Seaforth branch of the Queensland Country Women's Association meets at 1-3 Margaret Street.

Seaforth Uniting Church is at 43 Palm Avenue.

Star of the Sea Catholic Church is at 2241 Yakapari-Seaforth Road. It is part of the Farleigh parish.

Seaforth Bowls Club is in Walsh Street.

References

Further reading

External links

 
 
 

Towns in Queensland
Mackay Region
Coastline of Queensland
Localities in Queensland